Redd Alert (RA) are an indigenous Canadian organized crime group which operates as both a prison gang and a street gang.

History
Redd Alert was established in 1999 by Robert Lee Wenger along with other First Nations inmates of Cree, Anishinaabe, and Métis origin as an alternative to joining two of the other Aboriginal gangs within the Alberta prison system: the Indian Posse and the Manitoba Warriors. Details on their origin are unclear but some reports say they originated as an offshoot of the Edmonton Northside Boys.

Structure
Redd Alert is composed mainly of Indigenous youth, many of whom come from rough, displaced backgrounds such as dysfunctional households and juvenile detention. Redd Alert maintain an alliance with the Hells Angels Motorcycle Club, for whom they reportedly sell drugs for. They are also allies with the White Boy Posse, a neo-Nazi criminal organization that operates throughout the Canadian West. Redd Alert are also affiliated with the Independent Soldiers, another street gang within Canada's Western provinces.

References

Organizations established in the 1990s
1990s establishments in Alberta
Street gangs
Prison gangs
Indigenous gangs
Gangs in Alberta
Gangs in British Columbia
Gangs in Manitoba